The Venerable Henry Ryder, D.D. was an Anglican priest in England.

Ryder was educated at Emmanuel College, Cambridge. He was incorporated at Oxford in 1711. He held living at Grimley, Worcester, Hertingfordbury and Hertford. He was Archdeacon of Derby from 1719 until his death on 19 April 1755. Helme died in 1628.

Notes 

Alumni of Emmanuel College, Cambridge
Archdeacons of Derby
18th-century English Anglican priests
1755 deaths